Mihai Șubă (born June 1, 1947) is a Romanian and Spanish chess player. FIDE awarded him the International Master title in 1975 and the International Grandmaster title in 1978. 

Born in Bucharest, Romania, Șubă, won the Romanian Chess Championship in 1980, 1981, and 1985. Suba began playing chess at 19 years old, making him an anomaly among grandmasters. He attended the University of Bucharest and trained in the university's chess club, where his passion for chess grew quickly. His rate of progress was that of a prodigy: by age 27 he had won several local championships and achieved a FIDE rating of 2460.

Suba first came to wide attention in 1982 when he finished second, after Zoltán Ribli, at Băile Herculane. At the 1982 Las Palmas Interzonal, he finished third, behind Ribli and former World Champion Vasily Smyslov, just missing qualification for the Candidates Matches. Șubă finished first at Dortmund 1983, and equal first at Prague 1985 and Timișoara 1987. In August 1988, he sought political asylum in Britain, and he played for England at the 1989 European Team Chess Championship, though he started playing for Romania again in 1992. In 2017 he switched his national federation to Spain.

Șubă is the author of the book Dynamic Chess Strategy and of the monograph The Hedgehog.

2008 World Senior Championship 
Controversy erupted at the 2008 World Senior Chess Championship when Larry Kaufman was named the winner on tiebreakers ahead of Șubă in second place. The tie-breaking system used, erroneously interpreted as mandatory by FIDE, did not match the one published by the organizer, which was the valid one according to newer regulations and had the strength of a contract.

Subsequently, Șubă and Kaufman were retroactively declared joint winners of the championship at a FIDE Presidential Board meeting in March 2009 (with Kaufman keeping his resultant promotion to grandmaster).

References

External links 
 
 
 
 
 

1947 births
Living people
Chess grandmasters
World Senior Chess Champions
Chess Olympiad competitors
Romanian chess players
English chess players
Spanish chess players
Chess writers